Pablo de Jesus Rodríguez Alvarez, known as Pablo Rodríguez (born 29 June 1973 in Puebla) is a retired Mexican professional footballer. 
He played on the professional level in Liga MX for C.F. Pachuca, Puebla F.C. and F.C. Atlas.

External links

1973 births
Living people
Mexican footballers
Association football defenders 
Association football midfielders
C.F. Pachuca players
Club Puebla players
Atlas F.C. footballers
Correcaminos UAT footballers
Liga MX players
People from Puebla (city)